Dracula, the Musical is a musical based on the original 1897 Victorian novel by Bram Stoker. The score is by Frank Wildhorn, with lyrics and book by Don Black and Christopher Hampton.

The show had its regional premiere at the La Jolla Playhouse, La Jolla, California, in 2001, playing to 115% capacity, earning the highest paid capacity for any world premiere production in the playhouse's history. It then premiered on Broadway in 2004, starring Tom Hewitt as the vampire Count and Melissa Errico as the woman he loves, Mina Harker.

A brief nude scene in which Dracula seduces Lucy Westenra (played by Kelli O'Hara) received much publicity, as did the show's numerous special effects. Despite that, the show ran for only 154 performances, and received mainly negative reviews. The show was heavily revised and later had engagements in Europe, where it proved to be a hit.

Plot

Act I 
Jonathan Harker, a young lawyer from England, travels to Transylvania to fix a deal with the elderly Count Dracula, who wants to buy a home in London (Prologue). Harker enjoys a lavish supper set by his host and asks the Count if he knows anyone in England. Dracula responds that he knows Harker and that other contacts have been made in advance to ensure his arrival in England is well received. The Count voices his desire to begin a new life in his new country ("Solitary Man"). Dracula shows Harker to his bedroom, where he notices a picture of Harker's fiancée Mina Murray, which seems to have a strange effect on him. Once Dracula leaves, Harker composes a letter to Mina, who herself remembers how they met ("Whitby Bay"). Mina, in England, suddenly hears Dracula's voice in her head; the Count forebodingly informs her of his imminent journey to England and his desire to be with her.

Early one morning, Dracula surprises Harker while shaving, causing Harker to cut himself. Dracula advances towards his guest's bleeding throat but retreats once he catches a glimpse of a crucifix around Harker's neck. Harker tries to get Dracula to focus on the contract, but Dracula ignores him, instead advising him to only sleep in his chamber. Harker's stay in the castle slowly begins turning into a nightmare, and he frantically searches for a way out ("Jonathan's Bedroom").

Dracula's Brides appear in one of the rooms the unfortunate English man wanders into and begin to seduce him. Harker removes the crucifix from his neck, and the Brides prepare to drink his blood ("Forever Young"). Dracula suddenly appears and scolds the women for disobeying his orders to leave Harker for himself. When the Brides ask if they are to have nothing, Dracula gives them an infant to consume. When the infant's distraught mother enters, begging for the return of her child, Dracula kills her and proceeds to drink Harker's blood to restore his youth ("Fresh Blood"). Fully rejuvenated, Dracula flies into the air, while Harker escapes to Budapest.

Back in London, Dracula contacts his servant Renfield, who is incarcerated in the insane asylum of Dr. Jack Seward and promises him eternal life in exchange for his services. Renfield envisions Dracula's approach to Whitby Bay via the ship Demeter, and sees the Count kill the captain and the crew ("The Master's Song").

After reading about the disaster, Mina discusses the news with her friend Lucy Westenra, and about Lucy's trouble with sleepwalking, which the latter had inherited from her late father. The conversation quickly turns to Lucy's dilemma of having three marriage proposals offered to her in one day. All three suitors come to dinner at her house that night: Quincey Morris, the "brave" cowboy from Texas; Dr. Jack Seward, the "bright" owner of the mental institution in Purfleet; and Arthur Holmwood, Lucy's "boring" childhood sweetheart. In the end, Lucy chooses Holmwood ("How Do You Choose?").

That night, Lucy sleepwalks and finds Dracula. When the vampire begins to drink her blood Mina, who had followed Lucy, appears. The Count explains, inside Mina's mind, that she is the one he wanted, but Lucy answered his call instead. When Mina begs Dracula to release her friend, the Count vows he will, but only if Mina will come with him; a proposal that Mina blatantly refuses. Angered and shocked that Mina can resist him, Dracula vanishes. Lucy awakens and describes her encounter with Dracula to Mina ("The Mist"). Mina explains to Lucy that she has received a telegram from Harker in Budapest and that she must go to marry him at once. Lucy congratulates Mina, excited that they will both become brides. Dracula, watching from afar, comments that he has already corrupted one mortal soul. ("The Mist-Reprise").

Mina prepares for her journey, upsetting Dracula. Stirred by emotions he has not felt in centuries, Dracula follows Mina to the train station and, from afar, voices his desire to be with her. Torn between her devotion to Harker and her darker desires, Mina begins to question what she wants in life. Ultimately, she travels to Budapest and marries Harker ("A Perfect Life/Loving You Keeps Me Alive/Whitby Bay-Reprise"). At the same time, Lucy marries Arthur Holmwood in London ("The Weddings"). Feeling that Mina has eluded him, a frustrated Dracula appears before Lucy at her reception, causing her to faint.

Dr. Seward calls upon the renowned vampire expert Abraham Van Helsing to help the weakened Lucy. Van Helsing decorates Lucy's room with garlic and gives her a bottle of holy water to keep with her as she sleeps. Drawn to Dracula's power, Lucy disposes of the garlic and holy water and invites the vampire into her room ("The Invitation"). Dracula appears and drains Lucy of blood, all the while feeding her his own.

The next morning Lucy attacks Holmwood, her teeth now long and sharp. Van Helsing saves Holmwood and sends the feral Lucy into a frenzy with a prayer. Lucy dies, leaving Holmwood confused and heartbroken. Van Helsing comforts the despairing man while explaining the nature of the vampire ("Nosferatu").

Lucy is buried and shortly rises again as a vampire. Dracula comes to her and christens her as the first of his new "dynasty." The Count then sends Lucy out to find her first victims, before flying into the sky in the form of a giant bat ("Life After Life").

Act II 
Two weeks later, Van Helsing leads Holmwood, Morris, Dr. Seward, Harker, and Mina to Lucy's tomb. There has been an epidemic of small children being abducted and drained of blood in the dead of night by someone described as a "bloofer lady." Van Helsing seeks to prove to Holmwood, Morris, and Dr. Seward, who remain skeptical, that the culprit is none other than the undead Lucy Westenra. They enter and find Lucy's coffin empty. Lucy then enters the tomb, with a small child she intended to feed on, and is confronted by the vampire hunters ("Undead One, Surrender"). The group forces her into her coffin with religious chanting, and Holmwood tearfully drives a stake through her heart, while Van Helsing decapitates her. Lucy dies and is finally able to rest in peace.

While musing on the events of the previous day, Mina once more hears Dracula's voice in her mind. When Dracula asks why she is forcing him to wait, Mina points out that he murdered Lucy. Dracula retorts that she is wrong, for he gave Lucy eternal life, and it was the vampire hunters who killed her. Mina feels a strange attraction to the Count, even though he turned Lucy into a vampire. Caught between her fear of his terrible power and her growing affinity towards him, Mina pleads with the vampire not to make her love him unless he truly loves her ("Please Don't Make Me Love You").

Van Helsing discovers Renfield's mind connection with Dracula and visits his cell with Mina. Renfield explains his connection with the Count and how he has been promised eternal life. When Van Helsing asks if he and Renfield had met somewhere before, the madman eerily replies that he knows what happened to Van Helsing's wife. Shaken by Renfield's comment, Van Helsing storms out of the cell. Mina tries to reason with Renfield by asking him if eternal life is worth damning his soul. Renfield warns Mina of Dracula's plans for her but quickly realizes she has sealed his fate by betraying his master. Once left alone, Dracula appears and kills his former servant ("The Master's Song-Reprise").

Van Helsing has a private moment as he recollects on his youth and his wife Roseanne, whose death at the hands of a vampire, hinted to have been Dracula, inspired him to become a vampire hunter in her honor ("Roseanne").

Holmwood, Morris, and Dr. Seward have uncovered Dracula's hiding place in the house Harker had sold to him while they were in Transylvania. Van Helsing, Holmwood, Morris, and Dr. Seward leave, leaving Mina with Harker. While Harker shows the men to the door, Mina can't help but feel a growing need to save Dracula from destruction. Unable to fight her desire for the Count any longer, she invites the vampire into the house ("If I Could Fly"). Dracula enters and puts Harker in a trance before seducing Mina. The two share a moment of passion before Dracula cuts open his chest and lets Mina taste his blood, intending to turn her into a vampire ("The Seduction (There's Always A Tomorrow")). The vampire hunters return and confront Dracula, causing him to flee ("It's Over").

Using hypnosis, Van Helsing gets Mina, who is now telepathically connected to Dracula, to reveal the Count's whereabouts. Dracula is shown to be returning home to Transylvania due to the destruction of his hiding place in London. Mina makes each man, even Harker, promise to kill her if it seems her soul is beyond saving ("Jonathan's Promise"). The hunters then prepare for their journey and the final battle with Dracula ("Deep In the Darkest Night"). Meanwhile, Harker broods over the horrifying promise he has made to his wife but vows to keep it ("Before the Summer Ends").

Aboard a train, Van Helsing again hypnotizes Mina to reveal Dracula's movements. She reveals Dracula is hidden in a coffin in the hull of a ship, before becoming engulfed by Dracula's mind. With the trance broken, Mina retires while the others plan their next move. ("The Train Sequence/Life After Life-Reprise").

Dracula, back at his castle, reflects on his eternal life and realizes he has fallen deeply in love with Mina ("The Longer I Live").

The hunters reach Dracula's castle, and the showdown takes place. Morris is killed by Dracula when he tries to stake the vampire in his coffin. Van Helsing leaves Mina in a protective circle of holy water to help Holmwood, Harker, and Dr. Seward fight Dracula's Brides. Dracula shortly appears before Mina, who now decides to follow her beloved into the darkness. Upon hearing the death screams of his brides, Dracula realizes that Mina will share the same fate if she becomes a vampire. Having fallen in love with her, he cannot bring himself to condemn her to live in death.

Knowing that her only salvation is his demise, Dracula asks Mina to release him from his doomed existence with a Bowie knife he took from Morris. With tears running down her face, she fulfills her lover's last wish, just before the hunters return. Harker finds his wife cradling the body of Dracula in her arms ("Finale: There's Always A Tomorrow").

Productions 
 The musical had its world premiere developmental engagement at La Jolla Playhouse from October 9 to November 25, 2001, starring Tom Hewitt in the title role. The musical, after several revisions and additional workshops, premiered on Broadway at the Belasco Theatre on August 19, 2004, and closed on January 2, 2005, after 157 performances and 22 previews.  Directed by Des McAnuff, the choreography was by Mindy Cooper, the scenic design by Heidi Ettinger, costume design by Catherine Zuber, lighting by Howell Binkley orchestrations by Doug Besterman and special effects by Flying by Foy.  The musical starred Tom Hewitt, along with Melissa Errico as Mina. Darren Ritchie joined as Jonathan Harker, with Stephen McKinley Henderson as Van Helsing, and Chris Hoch as Arthur Holmwood. The show featured Don Stephenson as Renfield, and Kelli O'Hara as Lucy. Chuck Wagner was the standby for the roles of Dracula and Van Helsing. Elizabeth Loyacano was promoted to standby for Errico, after the role proved to be more demanding than it had been previously expected. She performed the role from September 7 through October 13. The original Catherine Zuber designed wardrobe is on display at the Costume World Broadway Collection at the Wick Theatre & Costume Museum in Boca Raton, Florida.
 After the show closed on January 2, 2005, the musical made its international debut at Theater St. Gallen, Switzerland, from April 23, 2005, to June 6, 2006.  This was in a much-revised form, with many changes that Wildhorn had reportedly wanted for Broadway. This version included 6 new songs, performed by a 40-piece orchestra and a European cast, led by Thomas Borchert and Drew Sarich alternating the role of Dracula.
 The UK premiere of the musical took place in March 2010 at The Lowther Pavilion, Lytham St Annes, Lancashire. Produced by AV Productions the cast included Andy Vitolo as Dracula, Mairi Claire Connor as Mina, Mike Cosgrove as Van Helsing, Jeremy Clark as Jonathan Harker, Lucy Fellows as Lucy Westenra, Derek Winward as Arthur/Renfield and Phil Gwilliam as Dr Jack Seward, subsequent performances took place at The Lancaster Grand Theatre in September the same year.
 The Japanese premiere took place in August 2011 in Tokyo. Dracula was played by female performer Yoka Wao, the first woman to play the role of the Count on stage. Prior to that Wao has been a star in all-female Japanese musical theatre troupe the Takarazuka Revue. The cast also included Mari Hanafusa as Mina, Soma Suzuki as Van Helsing, Natsumi Abe as Lucy, Ryosei Konishi as Jonathan. The production was recorded and released both on CD and DVD.
 The Scandinavian premiere took place February 22, 2014 in Kristianstad, Sweden, produced by Emil Sigfridsson and directed by David Rix, with Choreography by Anna Renud and Musical direction by Jonas Svensson. Johan Wikström starred in the title role of Dracula.
 The South Korean premiere opened in Seoul, South Korea on July 17, 2014, and played until September 5, 2014, at the Seoul Art Center’s Opera Theatre. The show is produced by Shin Choon Soo with Ryu Jung Han and Kim Junsu alternating the role of Dracula.

Songs (Broadway)

Act I
 Prologue - Harker
 A Quiet Life - Dracula
 Over Whitby Bay - Harker & Mina
 Jonathan's Bedroom - Harker
 Forever Young - Dracula's Brides
 Fresh Blood - Dracula, Brides & Harker
 The Master's Song - Renfield
 How Do You Choose? - Lucy, Mina, Arthur, Dr. Seward & Quincey
 The Mist - Lucy
 The Mist (Reprise) - Dracula
 Modern World - Lucy, Mina, Arthur, Dr. Seward & Quincey
 A Perfect Life - Mina
 The Weddings - Mina, Harker, Arthur & Lucy
 Nosferatu - Van Helsing
 Prayer for the Dead - Van Helsing, Mina, Harker, Dr. Seward, Arthur, Quincey & Chorus
 Life After Life - Dracula & Lucy

Act II
 Undead one, Surrender - Van Helsing, Mina, Harker, Dr. Seward, Arthur, Quincey
 The Heart is Slow to Learn - Mina
 The Master's Song (Reprise)- Renfield & Dracula
 If I Could Fly - Mina
 Mina's seduction - Mina & Dracula
 There's Always a Tomorrow - Dracula & Mina
 Deep in the Darkest Night - Van Helsing, Arthur, Quincey & Dr. Seward
 Before the Summer Ends - Harker
 All is Dark/Life After Life (reprise)- Mina & Dracula
 The Longer I Live - Dracula
 Finale: There's Always a Tomorrow - Mina & Dracula

Songs (Austria) 

Act I
 Prologue - Vamp Brides
 A Solitary Man - Dracula
 Whitby Bay - Mina & Harker
 Jonathan's Bedroom - Harker
 Forever Young - Vamp Brides
 Fresh Blood - Dracula, Vamp Brides & Harker
 The Master's Song - Renfield
 How Do You Choose? - Lucy, Mina, Arthur, Dr. Seward & Quincey
 The Mist - Lucy
 The Mist - (Reprise) - Dracula
 A Perfect Life/Loving You Keeps Me Alive/Whitby Bay (Reprise) - Mina, Harker & Dracula
 The Weddings - Mina, Harker, Arthur & Lucy
 The Invitation * - Lucy
 Nosferatu * - Van Helsing
 Prayer for the Dead - Van Helsing, Arthur, Dr. Seward, Quincey, Mina & Chorus
 Life After Life - Dracula & Lucy

Act II
 Undead One, Surrender - Van Helsing, Mina, Arthur, Dr. Seward, Quincey & Harker
 Please Don't Make Me Love You * - Mina
 The Master's Song (Reprise) - Renfield & Dracula
 Roseanne * (written specially for Uwe Kröger) - Van Helsing
 If I Could Fly - Mina
 The Seduction (There's Always a Tomorrow)- Dracula & Mina
 It's Over * (written specially for Uwe Kröger and Thomas Borchert) - Dracula & Van Helsing
 Jonathan's Promise * - Harker
 Deep in the Darkest Night - Van Helsing, Quincey, Arthur, Dr. Seward, Mina & Harker
 Before the Summer Ends - Harker
 The Train Sequence (Life After Life-Reprise) - Dracula, Mina & Van Helsing
 The Longer I Live - Dracula
 Finale: There's Always a Tomorrow - Dracula & Mina

(* new songs added to the show in revised version)

Casts

Critical response 
Wildhorn musicals usually endured critical derision, and Dracula would prove to be no exception.  Reviews were universally negative, referring to the lyrics as unoriginal, and to the music as monotonous and derivative of both Andrew Lloyd Webber and Wildhorn's previous productions.  Though this production was intended as a serious, dramatic interpretation of the source material, critics complained of a complete lack of emotion in general, and of suspense and horror in particular.  Also, while the plot of the musical hits all the major points of Stoker's novel, critics felt it did so in such an obtuse way that audience members unfamiliar with the story may find themselves unable to comprehend the action.

However the new, revised version, that opened in Graz, Austria, in the Summer of 2007 was very successful among critics and audiences. The version of the show licensed by Music Theatre International is based on this production. A Cast Recording was released in 2008 and was a huge hit in the sale charts.

Recordings 
Concept Album
Recorded in 2005.  A concept recording created by GlobalVision Records and was released on Amazon MP3 and iTunes on June 6, 2011.  It features James Barbour in the title role alongside Kate Shindle as Mina, Lauren Kennedy as Lucy, Rob Evan as Harker, Norm Lewis as Van Helsing, and Euan Morton as Reinfeld.

World Premiere Recording - Austrian Cast
In 2008 was released the first Cast Recording of the show, produced by HitSquad Records with the Cast of the Summer Festival in Graz, Austria. The CD contains the new, revised, re-orchestrated version of the show, being now quite different from the Broadway flop. The CD features Thomas Borchert as Dracula, Uwe Kröger as Van Helsing, Jesper Tydén as Jonathan, Lyn Liechty as Mina and Caroline Vasicek as Lucy. The new German version was a hit, and the CD was for almost half a year in the top of sales at Soundofmusic-shop.de the biggest Musical-Related store in Continental Europe.

Demo/Promotional Recordings
 Demo Recording (2000) - featuring Douglas Sills as Dracula, Christiane Noll as Mina, Alice Ripley as Lucy, Rob Evan as Harker, Chuck Wagner as Van Helsing and William Youmans as Reinfeld.
 Guy LeMonnier Demo (2003) - featuring  Guy LeMonnier as Dracula.
 Broadway Promo (2004) - featuring  Tom Hewitt as Dracula, Melissa Errico as Mina, Lauren Kennedy as Lucy and Rob Evan as Harker.

Sources

External links 
 

2004 musicals
Broadway musicals
Vampires in music
Plays based on Dracula
Musicals based on novels
Plays set in the 19th century
Musicals by Frank Wildhorn
Musicals based on films
Works set in castles